Tuplice  is a village in Żary County, Lubusz Voivodeship, in western Poland. It is the seat of the gmina (administrative district) called Gmina Tuplice.

History
1815 Teuplitz was part of Prussia from 1815; a glassworks and a brickyard date to this period.
Until 1945 Teuplitz belonged to the Brandenburg district of Sorau. The railway lines Cottbus-Sorau and Muskau-Sommerfeld made the place an important railway junction in the Lower Lusatia. In 1933, the community had 1,381 inhabitants, which increased to 1,439 in 1939.

In the village of Schniebinchen there was a Hakhshara camp for young Jews from 1938 to 1939, which prepared them for emigration to Palestine by teaching agriculture.

In 1945 Teuplitz was partially destroyed. After the takeover by the Polish administration, the place declined in importance (see Territorial changes of Poland after World War II).

The village has a population of 1,500.

References

Tuplice